Mạc Kính Cung (莫敬恭, ?–1593) was the eighth emperor of the Mạc dynasty. He reigned from 1592–1625. 

He was the seventh son of Mạc Kính Điển. The emperor Mạc Kính Chỉ was captured by Trịnh lord in 1593, he was enthroned by Mạc Ngọc Liễn in Lạng Sơn. In the next year, he was defeated by Hoàng Đình Ái and fled to Longzhou, China.

Cung came back to Vietnam occupied Cao Bằng in 1596. He was attacked by Trịnh lord, and sought aid for Ming China. Trịnh lord had to recognized his dominant position in Cao Bằng under the pressure of Ming China.

In 1600, Bùi Thị, the mother of Mạc Mậu Hợp, rebelled in Thang Long and summoned him. Trịnh Tùng recaptured Thang Long and executed Bùi Thị, then defeated Cung in Hải Dương. Cung fled back to Cao Bằng.

In 1625, Trịnh Kiều (son of Trịnh Tráng) attacked Cao Bằng and captured him. He was executed in Thang Long.

References

1625 deaths
Mạc dynasty emperors
Year of birth unknown
Vietnamese monarchs